Katsiaryna Netsviatayeva (born 28 June 1989) is a Belarusian athlete who specialises in the heptathlon. She competed in the heptathlon event at the 2016 European Championships in Amsterdam, Netherlands.

Personal bests

Outdoor

Indoor

References

External links 
 

1989 births
Living people
Belarusian female athletes
Belarusian heptathletes
Athletes (track and field) at the 2016 Summer Olympics
Olympic athletes of Belarus